Do You Party? is an album and single by The Soft Pink Truth, a side-project of Drew Daniel of Matmos. Both the album and single were released on Matthew Herbert's label Soundslike Records in 2003.

There is a quasi-duet between Blevin Blectum of Blectum from Blechdom and Drew Daniel on the song "Gender Studies".

The song "Make Up" is a cover of a Vanity 6 song. It is written by Prince.

Track listing
All songs written by Drew Daniel except “Make Up” written by Prince.

 "Everybody's Soft" – 4:25
 "Gender Studies" – 5:10
 "Promo Funk" – 4:22
 "Make Up" – 3:23
 "Coat Check" – 4:19
 "Soft on Crime" – 4:59
 "Satie (Grey Corduroy Suit)" – 5:05
 "Soft Pink Missy" – 4:31
 "Big Booty Bitches" – 4:31
 "Over You (No Love)" – 7:55
 "I Want to Thank You" – 2:21

Personnel 
Artist
 Drew Daniel

Vocals
 Blevin Blectum ("Make Up")

Extra Musicians
Rex Ray - Desaccordee
Martin C. Schmidt - Synthesizer

Technical staff
Xopher Davidson - Mastering

References

2003 debut albums
The Soft Pink Truth albums